The 1990 GTE U.S. Men's Hard Court Championships was a men's tennis tournament played on outdoor hard courts at the Indianapolis Tennis Center in Indianapolis, Indiana in the United States that was part of the Championship Series of the 1990 ATP Tour. It was the third edition of the tournament and was held from August 13 through August 19, 1990. First-seeded Boris Becker won the singles title.

Finals

Singles
 Boris Becker defeated  Peter Lundgren 6–3, 6–4
 It was Becker's 3rd title of the year and the 27th of his career.

Doubles
 Scott Davis /  David Pate defeated  Grant Connell /  Glenn Michibata 4–6, 6–2, 6–2
 It was Davis' 4th title of the year and the 14th of his career. It was Pate's 4th title of the year and the 13rd of his career.

References

External links
 ITF tournament edition details

GTE U.S. Men's Hard Court Championships
Atlanta Open (tennis)
Tennis tournaments in Indiana
GTE U.S. Men's Hard Court Championships
GTE U.S. Men's Hard Court Championships
GTE U.S. Men's Hard Court Championships